Eucalyptus dorrigoensis, commonly known as the  Dorrigo white gum, is a species of tree that is endemic to New South Wales. It has smooth white, grey or pink bark, lance-shaped to curved adult leaves, flower buds in groups of seven, white flowers and cup-shaped, conical or hemispherical fruit.

Description
It has smooth, slightly powdery white, grey or pink bark, sometimes with slabs of rough bark near the base. Flowering occurs in May and the flowers are white.

Taxonomy and naming
Dorrigo white gum was first formally described in 1934 by William Blakely in his book A Key to Eucalypts and given the name Eucalyptus benthamii var. dorrigoensis. In 1990, Lawrie Johnson and Ken Hill raised the variety to species status as Eucalyptus dorrigoensis. The specific epithet (dorrigoensis) is a reference to the distribution of this species near Dorrigo - the ending -ensis is a Latin suffix "denoting place, locality [or] country".

Distribution and habitat
Eucalyptus dorrigoensis grows in deep soils in valley forests from near the upper Macleay River to east of Tenterfield and mainly near Dorrigo.

See also
List of Eucalyptus species

References

dorrigoensis
Flora of New South Wales
Myrtales of Australia
Plants described in 1934
Taxa named by William Blakely